William Robert Gouldsworthy (20 May 1892 – 4 February 1969) was an English cricketer. He played 26 first-class matches for Gloucestershire between 1921 and 1929.

References

1892 births
1969 deaths
English cricketers
Gloucestershire cricketers
Cricketers from Bristol